Dialnet may refer to:

 Dialnet (bibliographic database), a database maintained by the University of La Rioja
 Dialnet (networking), an UUCPnet-like modem communications system used by Symbolics, Inc. Lisp machines

See also
 Dial-up Internet access